Doftana may refer to the following places in Romania:

Doftana, a village in Telega Commune, Prahova County
Doftana prison, a Romanian prison built in 1895, located in the above village
Doftana (Prahova), a tributary of the Prahova in Prahova County
Doftana (Tărlung), a tributary of the Tărlung in Brașov County

See also 
 Dofteana, a commune in Bacău County
 Dofteana (river), a river in Bacău County